João Pedro Almeida Machado (born 3 April 1993), known as João Pedro, is a Portuguese professional footballer who plays as a midfielder for G.D. Chaves.

Club career

Vitória Guimarães
Born in the village of Vermil in Guimarães, João Pedro joined local Vitória SC's youth system at the age of 12. He made his senior debut with their reserves, his first Segunda Liga appearance taking place on 11 November 2012 when he came on as a 73rd-minute substitute in a 0–0 home draw against C.F. Os Belenenses.

João Pedro first appeared with the first team in competitive matches – and in the Primeira Liga – on 4 May 2014, playing injury time in a 0–0 away draw with Académica de Coimbra. In the 2014–15 season he started in 42 matches for the B side, scoring once to help them finish ninth in the second tier.

João Pedro scored his only goal for Vitória's main squad on 18 December 2016, playing the entire 3–1 home win over Vitória de Setúbal.

LA Galaxy
On 19 January 2017, João Pedro signed with the LA Galaxy. He made his debut in the Major League Soccer on 4 March, starting and being booked in a 1–2 loss against FC Dallas at StubHub Center. He scored his first goal in the competition on 28 May, contributing to the 4–2 away defeat of the San Jose Earthquakes.

On 20 August 2018, João Pedro joined Super League Greece club Apollon Smyrnis F.C. on loan. He scored his first goal for his new team on 1 November, in a 5–0 home victory over Apollon Paralimnio F.C. in the group stage of the Greek Cup.

Tondela
João Pedro returned to his homeland after being loaned to C.D. Tondela on a short-team deal on 29 January 2019, and the move was extended in August. On 10 January 2020, he agreed to a permanent contract until June 2022.

On 7 November 2021, João Pedro scored a hat-trick in the first half of a 4–2 home win over C.S. Marítimo, all from the penalty spot.

References

External links

1993 births
Living people
Sportspeople from Guimarães
Portuguese footballers
Association football midfielders
Primeira Liga players
Liga Portugal 2 players
Segunda Divisão players
Vitória S.C. B players
Vitória S.C. players
C.D. Tondela players
G.D. Chaves players
Major League Soccer players
USL Championship players
LA Galaxy players
LA Galaxy II players
Super League Greece players
Apollon Smyrnis F.C. players
Portuguese expatriate footballers
Expatriate soccer players in the United States
Expatriate footballers in Greece
Portuguese expatriate sportspeople in the United States
Portuguese expatriate sportspeople in Greece